Out of Death is a 2021 American action thriller film directed by Mike Burns and starring Bruce Willis and Jaime King.

Plot

Retired from Detroit Police Department cop Jack Harris has to protect his niece and an innocent woman from corrupt cops after the woman took a video of one of the police killing a drug dealer.

Cast
 Jaime King as Shannon Mathers
 Bruce Willis as Detroit P.D. Ret,Det. Jack Harris
 Lala Kent as Deputy Officer Billie Jean
 Michael Sirow as Hank Rivers
 Tyler Olson as Tommy Rivers
 Kelly Greyson as Pam Harris
 Mike Burns as Officer Frank Rogers

Production
Filming occurred in November 2020. Complications with COVID-19 safety protocols created difficulties in getting the cast and crew cleared to shoot and delayed production for several days. As a result, the entire film was shot in nine days and all of Bruce Willis's scenes, which included 25 pages of dialogue, were shot in only one day. Out of Death is one of the last films to star Willis, who retired from acting because he was diagnosed with aphasia.

Release
The film received a limited theatrical run and was released on demand on July 16, 2021.

Critical reception
Peter Bradshaw of The Guardian rated it 2 out of 5 and wrote: "The film squanders one or two promising plot ideas, and winds up making a hamfisted paean of praise to the idea of “open carry” gun ownership." Todd Jorgenson of Cinemalogue gave the film a negative review and stated, "The cryptic title is about the only intriguing facet of this formulaic cat-and-mouse thriller." Brian Orndorf of Blu-ray.com gave the film a 'D−' and stated, "The latest stop on the "Is Bruce Willis okay?" tour of VOD cinema." Peter Sobczynski of eFilmCritic.com gave the film 1 out of 5 stars and stated, "An astonishingly lethargic and empty-headed action-thriller." Mark Dujsik of Mark Reviews Movies gave the film 0.5 out of 4 stars and stated, "One ends up feeling pretty bad for everyone involved."

Accolades
As with all 2021 movies in which he appeared, Bruce Willis received a Golden Raspberry Award nomination for his performance in this movie in the category Worst Performance by Bruce Willis in a 2021 Movie. The category was later rescinded after he announced his retirement due to aphasia.

Notes

References

External links
 

2021 films
2021 action thriller films
2021 crime thriller films
2021 independent films
American action thriller films
American crime thriller films
Films impacted by the COVID-19 pandemic
American independent films
Vertical Entertainment films
2020s English-language films
2020s American films